Martin Joseph Blake (1790 – March 1861) was an Irish Independent Irish Party and Repeal Association politician.

Blake was the son of Walter Blake and Mary Joseph. He was at some point a Deputy Lieutenant.

Blake became Repeal Association Member of Parliament (MP) for Galway Borough in 1833—following the unseating of Lachlan MacLachlan—and, elected for the Independent Irish Party in 1852, held the seat until the 1857 general election when he did not seek re-election.

References

External links
 

1790 births
1861 deaths
Irish Repeal Association MPs
Irish Nationalist politicians
Deputy Lieutenants in Ireland
Members of the Parliament of the United Kingdom for County Galway constituencies (1801–1922)
UK MPs 1832–1835
UK MPs 1835–1837
UK MPs 1837–1841
UK MPs 1841–1847
UK MPs 1847–1852
UK MPs 1852–1857